The 101-Year-Old Man Who Skipped Out on the Bill and Disappeared is a 2016 Swedish comedy adventure film directed by Felix Herngren and Måns Herngren. The film serves as a sequel to the 2013 film The Hundred-Year-Old Man Who Climbed Out of the Window and Disappeared, based on the novel of the same name by Jonas Jonasson.

Plot 

One year after the events of previous film, Allan Karlsson and company celebrate Alan's 101st birthday in Bali. Allan offers Miriam and Julius his last "Folksoda", a carbonated beverage Allan accidentally helped create during his double agent days at the height of the Cold War in the 1970s. As Miriam and Julius argue over who gets to finish the soda, Allan's pet capuchin Erlander finishes the whole bottle. Soon after, Miriam and her husband Benny depart for Malmköping, while Allan and Julius stay at the resort with Gäddan.

Allan mentions that while that was the last Folksoda in existence, he stashed away the secret formula inside a Montecristo cigar box in Berlin. Allan tells the story of how his disastrous visit to a Russian lab with Popov led to the creation of Folksoda after the lab burned down in an electrical fire. Julius convinces Allan to call Amanda Einstein, who invites them to come to Berlin and retrieve the formula from her apartment. Julius, Allan, and Gäddan flee the resort (without paying their bill) and head for the airport. During check-in, a pair of security guards recognize Julius from a viral video in which he chases after Erlander on the beach. On the flight to Berlin, a stewardess named Rebecca opens Allan's carry-on suitcase and unknowingly allows Erlander to escape. The pilot contacts the nearest communications tower and makes an emergency landing in Moscow.

Meanwhile, a woman named Stirna meets with her therapist, Håkan, after she sees news coverage of the viral video featuring Julius and Erlander on the beach and the plane's emergency landing in Russia. She recognizes Allan as the man who stole the secret formula from her father, Popov. Hysterical, she convinces Håkan to join her in tracking down Allan and company in Moscow. At the same time, Rebecca returns home to her husband Bas, who recognizes Allan's description as the man who stole 50 million dollars from Bas's deceased brother, Pim. Bas packs a bag full of weapons and heads to Moscow.

Allan, Julius, and Gäddan are freed by Russian authorities but keep Erlander under quarantine at the airport. They check into a hotel where Allan recounts the story of how creating Folksoda led to top-secret meetings with Leonid Brezhnev and Richard Nixon. During a film shoot for Folksoda in East Germany, Allan met Popov's young daughter, Kristina. At the airport, Stirna bribes the Russian authorities into giving her Erlander. She pressures Håkan into organizing a swap with Allan: Erlander in exchange for the secret formula. When Allan and Julius arrive, they discover Håkan dead, having choked on the cork of a champagne bottle during an altercation with Erlander. Allan, Julius, and Gäddan board a train for Berlin, with Stirna and Bas in hot pursuit. In Malmköping, Inspector Aronsson receives word that two CIA agents will be investigating a slew of suspicious activity in town, brought upon by Miriam and Benny making international calls about Folksoda to Allan.

Stirna lies about her identity and joins the group on their trip to Berlin. Bas attempts to hold Gäddan at gunpoint but two passengers disable his weapon. Gäddan hotwires a car in Warsaw and the group proceeds to Berlin. Allan falls asleep and dreams about the night Popov was killed by East German border patrol guards as he tried to leave the country with Allan and the secret formula. With his final breath, he tells Allan that the secret formula must be delivered to "K".

The group arrives in Berlin and finds Amanda. She reminisces with Allan about a wild party in the 1970s where Allan got a tattoo on his left buttock while under the effects of LSD. Julius walks in on the two of them having sex. At Miriam's behest, Benny goes to Allan's old nursing home and collects his belongings, hoping to find more bottles of Folksoda. Inspector Aronsson meets with the CIA agents, who make plans to visit Benny at his home by the lake. Stirna and Allan locate the cigar box inside a secret compartment, only to find that it contains nothing but cigars. Allan discerns that the formula is in his other cigar box in Malmköping. Unknown to the group, Bas is tracking Stirna using cellphone locator software and follows the group to Sweden.

Inspector Aronsson and the CIA agents arrive at Benny's home, where their questioning is interrupted by Benny's constant vomiting from nervousness. They head to the nursing home and speak with the staff as to Allan's whereabouts. Concurrently, Allan and Julius sneak into the nursing home's storage area but Allan's belongings are already gone. Allan, Julius, Gäddan, and Stirna race to Benny's house and arrive just in time to save the cigar box from being used as kindling. They retrieve the formula, in microfiche form, and attempt to decipher it on Benny's microfiche reader.

Stirna confesses to Allan that she is Popov's daughter Kristina. Having finally found "K", Allan gives her the formula and tells her to return home. As Julius tries to stop her, the CIA agents arrive along with Bas, who holds everyone at gunpoint. Benny gives Bas the money Allan stole from Pim and the microfiche reader. Inspector Aronsson shoots Bas, who falls into a well and is killed by his own exploding grenade. The explosion destroys the money and the microfiche reader. The CIA agents arrest Gäddan and extradite him to the United States for his past crimes. Inspector Aronsson receives a medal from the government for his service. Julius discovers that Allan's tattoo on his buttock is a Russian transcription of how to make Folksoda.

Some time later, Miriam and Benny organize a luncheon at their house for Allan Jr., their newborn son. Stirna, having decided to stay with her new friends, helps Julius with creating Folksoda in an outdoor synthesis lab, but are missing a vital step in the creation process. Allan sits down with his friends to enjoy the meal as he carries both Allan Jr. and Erlander. A lightning bolt strikes Julius's makeshift lab, mimicking the electrical fire Allan caused all those years ago.

Cast 
 Robert Gustafsson as Allan Karlsson
 Iwar Wiklander as Julius Jonsson
 David Wiberg as Benny
 Shima Niavarani as Miriam
 Jens Hultén as Gäddan
 Svetlana Rodina-Ljungkvist as Stina
 Ralph Carlsson as Inspector Aronsson
 Jay Simpson as Bas
 David Shackleton as Herbert Einstein
 George Nikoloff as Popov
 Eric Stern as Håkan 
 Eleanor Matsuura as Rebecca
 Colin McFarlane as Seth
 Erni Mangold as Amanda Einstein
 Crystal the Monkey as Erlander
Valentin Smirnitsky as Leonid Brezhnev
Darrell Duffey as Richard Nixon
Mark Jardine as Bob Haldeman
Joseph Long as Henry Kissinger
 Dagny Carlsson as Patient at the retirement home

At the time of release, Dagny Carlsson was 104 years old.

References

External links 
 
 Svensk film databas 

2016 comedy films
2016 films
Cold War films
Cultural depictions of Henry Kissinger
Cultural depictions of Leonid Brezhnev
Cultural depictions of Richard Nixon
Films about old age
Films set in Germany
Films set in Poland
Films set in Russia
Films set in Sweden
Swedish comedy films
English-language Swedish films
2010s Swedish films